

Events

Indian Ocean
 Autumn - Thomas Tew's sloop Amity captures large Mughal vessel near strait of Bab-el-Mandeb.

Births

Deaths

See also 
 1692 in piracy
 1693
 1694 in piracy
 Timeline of piracy

Piracy
Piracy by year